Menahemia is a village in the Jordan Valley in north-eastern Israel. Located near Highway 90 between Beit She'an and Tzemah Junction 5 km south of Tzemah, it falls under the jurisdiction of Valley of Springs Regional Council.

History
The village was established on 23–26 December 1901 as a moshava under the name Milhamia by the five first families on land purchased by the Jewish Colonisation Association (ICA) in the Jordan Valley, and was the first Jewish settlement of its time in that region. It was renamed Menahemia in 1921 after the father of High Commissioner of Mandatory Palestine Herbert Samuel, 1st Viscount Samuel.

The village attracted new immigrants from Yemen during its nascent years, but because of cultural differences with the older residents, the Yemenites moved out and settled in the Shaʿaraim neighborhood of Rehovot.

Economy
Before World War I, a regional pharmacy was established in Menahemia. Other industries included a quarry, where they quarried raw materials for the Nesher cement factory near Haifa, and a gypsum manufacturing plant. There was also a museum for the medical history of the region, and the history of Menahemia and Naharayim.

Menahemia had its own local council from 1951 until 1 January 2006 when jurisdiction over the village was transferred to Beit She'an Valley Regional Council.

See also
Benny Shalita

References

Villages in Israel
Populated places established in 1901
Populated places in Northern District (Israel)
1901 establishments in the Ottoman Empire
Yemeni-Jewish culture in Israel